Coleophora vermiculatella is a moth of the family Coleophoridae. It is found in southern Spain.

The wingspan is 9.5-11.5 mm.

The larvae feed on Caroxylon vermiculatum. Young larvae feed on the infructescence. Later, they feed on the fruit. They create a trivalved case of 6–7 mm long with a mouth angle of 80-85°.

References

vermiculatella
Moths of Europe
Moths described in 1975